Shreyasi Chatterjee (born 1960, in Kolkata, West Bengal) is an Indian painter. Her work utilizes a mixture of indigenous Kantha embroidery and painting, and is influenced by Indian miniature painting and Modern Art. She attended Goldsmith College in London.

References

External links
 Images of Chatterjee's art on the Center of International Modern Art

1960 births
Living people
20th-century Indian painters
Indian women painters
Bengali women artists
Artists from Kolkata
Indian women contemporary artists
Indian contemporary painters
20th-century Indian women artists
Women artists from West Bengal
Painters from West Bengal
21st-century Indian women artists
Indian embroiderers